Les Rescapés is a Canadian television drama series, which debuted on Télévision de Radio-Canada in the 2010-11 television season.

The series stars Roy Dupuis and Guylaine Tremblay as Gérald and Monique Boivin, the patriarch and matriarch of a family from 1960s-era Montreal who find themselves mysteriously transported into 2010. The cast also includes Maxim Gaudette, Ève Lemieux, Antoine L'Écuyer, Benoît Girard, Céline Bonnier, Robert Lalonde, François Létourneau and Yan England.

References

External links

Les Rescapés at TOU.TV

2010 Canadian television series debuts
Ici Radio-Canada Télé original programming
2010s Canadian science fiction television series
Television shows set in Montreal
2010s Canadian drama television series
Canadian time travel television series
2010s Canadian time travel television series